Married Life is a 1921 British silent drama film directed by Georges Tréville and starring Gerald McCarthy, Peggy Hathaway and Roger Tréville. It was based on a play by J.B. Buckstone.

Cast
 Gerald McCarthy - Arthur Winchester
 Peggy Hathaway - Margaret
 Roger Tréville - Charles Dawson
 Hilda Anthony - Mrs. Winchester
 M. Gray Murray - Mr. Dawson
 Cameron Hildebrand - George
 Hugh Higson
 Dorothy Fane
 Beatrix Templeton
 Gordon Begg
 Leonard Robson

References

Bibliography

External links
 

1921 films
British drama films
British silent feature films
1921 drama films
British films based on plays
Ideal Film Company films
British black-and-white films
1920s English-language films
1920s British films
Silent drama films